Muhammad Rizal bin Che Aziz (born 1 January 1996) is a Malaysian footballer who plays as a defender for Perak.

References

External links
 

1996 births
Living people
People from Terengganu
Association football defenders
Malaysian footballers
Perak F.C. players
Malaysia Super League players